Working age is the range of ages at which people are typically engaged in either paid or unpaid work. It typically sits between the ages of adolescence and retirement.

In most countries there is a minimum age at which people can legally work.

See also
Employment-to-population ratio
Legal working age

Employment